Bruce Smith (born 28 June 1944) is  a former Australian rules footballer who played with Richmond in the Victorian Football League (VFL).

Notes

External links 
		

Living people
1944 births
Australian rules footballers from Victoria (Australia)
Richmond Football Club players